Earle McCurdy (born 1950) is a former leader of the Newfoundland and Labrador New Democratic Party and a former labour leader in Newfoundland and Labrador. He was president of the Fish, Food and Allied Workers Union from 1993 to 2014, succeeding founding president Richard Cashin. Previously, McCurdy was the union's secretary-treasurer for 13 years, from 1980 to 1993.

Background
McCurdy was born in Halifax, Nova Scotia in 1950, and grew up in St. John's, Newfoundland where he attended Prince of Wales Collegiate. He is a graduate of Memorial University of Newfoundland, where he obtained his Bachelor of Arts in 1972, and worked as a reporter for The St. John's Evening Telegram in the 1970s, covering the labour beat, before becoming involved with the fisheries' union.

His most notable time as union president was during Canada's fishing dispute with the European Union, known as the Turbot War.

NDP Leader
McCurdy was elected leader of the Newfoundland and Labrador NDP at the party's leadership convention held March 7, 2015, defeating two other contenders with 68% support on the first ballot. In the 2015 provincial election, McCurdy failed to win a seat in the House of Assembly and was defeated by Siobhán Coady by nearly 1000 votes.

In 2017, McCurdy announced he would resign as NDP leader. His resignation came after Steve Kent announced he would resign his seat of Mount Pearl North where McCurdy resided but which was unlikely to be winnable for the NDP.

Electoral record

References

External links
http://www.ffaw.nf.ca/?Content=About_Us/History
  Book Reference

Leaders of the Newfoundland and Labrador NDP/CCF
Trade unionists from Newfoundland and Labrador
Living people
1950 births
Memorial University of Newfoundland alumni
People from Halifax, Nova Scotia
Politicians from St. John's, Newfoundland and Labrador
Candidates in Newfoundland and Labrador provincial elections